Aap Ki Marzi is 1939 Hindi romantic comedy film directed by Sarvottam Badami. The film was produced under the Sudama Productions banner. The music composer was Gyan Dutt with lyrics credited to Pyare Lal Santoshi and S. P. Kalla. It starred Motilal, Sabita Devi, Khursheed, K. N. Singh, Mazhar Khan, Vasanti and Sunalini Devi. This was director Badami's second comedy film; he had earlier directed the comedy Teen Sau Din Ke Baad (1938) which turned out be a box office success. Aap Ki Marzi was based on the MGM produced, Edward Buzzell directed film Paradise for Three (1938) from Erich Kastner's novel.

The film is the story of an unemployed youth played by Motilal who wins the first prize in a crossword puzzle and the romantic-comic situations that arise thereafter.

Plot
Seth Bansilal (Mazhar Khan) posing as an ordinary man Govindlal, takes part in a crossword puzzle competition; he wins the second-prize trip to Kashmir. The first prize is won by an unemployed youth, Sumant (Motilal). Bansilal, accompanied by his niece Shashi (Sabita Devi), lands up at a hotel in Kashmir at the same time as Sumant. Due to some misunderstanding Sumant gets the room Bansilal's wife (Sunalini Devi) has booked for him. Bansilal opts to stay in a common cheaper room as Govindlal.  Several comic situations follow along with Sumant and Shashi falling in love and Sumant getting black-mailed by a girl in the hotel, Manjri (Khursheed). The misunderstandings are finally cleared with the lovers getting united.

Cast
Motilal as Sumant
Sabita Devi as Shashi
Khursheed as Manjri
Mazhar Khan as Sir Bansilal/Govindlal, 
K. N. Singh
Jagdish Sethi
Sunalini Devi

Music
The music direction was by Gyan Dutt and the lyricists were Pyare Lal Santoshi and S. P. Kalla. The songs were sung by Khursheed, Gyan Dutt and Vasanti.

Song List

References

External links

1939 films
1930s Hindi-language films
Films based on works by Erich Kästner
Films scored by Gyan Dutt
Indian romantic comedy films
1939 romantic comedy films
Indian black-and-white films
Films directed by Sarvottam Badami
Hindi-language comedy films